St. Anne's Church which was the  was established as a parish in 1999, with Rev Fr Philip Manathra as the first parish priest. The church and the parochial house were constructed in 2000 and 2002 respectively by Rev Fr Philip Manathra.

Location
The church is situated at the southern part of Chennai, India, on the internal road of Nesapakkam close to Ashok Nagar.

History

1998–2002
The church, which was a substation of Ashok Nagar, was established as a parish in 1999. Rev Fr Philip Manathra was the first parish priest. The church and the parochial house were constructed in 2000 and 2002 respectively by Rev Fr Philip Manathra.

2003–2010
During the time of Rev Fr Martin, St. Anne’s Matriculation School was built for poor children, and a multi-purpose hall was constructed.

2010–2012
Rev Fr K.M. Thomas continued his work and during his time a grotto was built in honour of Our Lady of Lourdes.

2012-2014
Rev  Fr  B.K. Francis Xavier built up the church spiritually. Due to frequent electricity cuts, he bought a generator.

2014–2017
A major renovation was carried out in 2014–2015 during the period of Rev Fr P.J. Lawrence Raj, and the whole campus was transformed to have a better atmosphere for prayer. The church and the rectory were given a new and refreshing look. New statues of Saint Anne and Our Lady of Good Health were installed. A new flag mast was erected and the whole campus paved with concrete blocks.

Associations
Altar Servers
Legion of Mary
St Vincent de Paul
Youth Group – Tamil
Franciscan III Order
Women SHSs- 4

Institutions under the Parish
St Anne’s Matriculation School (Co-Ed/E)
St Vincent de Paul Dispensary

Religious
Sisters of Charity of St Anne (SCh SA)

Gallery

See also

 Catholic Church in India
 Saint Thomas of Mylapur
 Christianity in India
 Christianity in Tamil Nadu

References

External links
St.Anne's Church official website